Insight dialogue is an interpersonal meditation practice that brings together meditative awareness (e.g., mindfulness, concentration), the wisdom teachings of the Buddha, and dialogue to support insight into the nature, causes, and release of human suffering. Six meditation instructions, or guidelines, form the core of the practice.

Rationale 
Engaging in mindful dialogue with one or more other people supported by instruction in the guidelines and by contemplations that encourage a direct and intimate inquiry into the human experience is the form of the practice. Insight dialogue is taught and practiced in a number of contexts—residential retreats, daylong workshops, community practice groups, and online (e.g., via Skype).

Insight dialogue has its roots in the Buddha's early teachings on the human experience (Pāli Canon) and the practice of Insight or Vipassanā meditation; however, people of all faiths and backgrounds can practice. Gregory Kramer and Terri O'Fallon co-created insight dialogue. Gregory Kramer, the Founder and Guiding Teacher of Metta Programs, continued developing the practice and has been teaching it worldwide since 1995.

Guidelines 
Although designed to work together, the insight dialogue guidelines are typically taught individually, in sequence.

Pause 
Temporal pause; stepping out of habitual thoughts and reactions into experience in the present moment; mindfulness.

Relax 
Invitation to calm the body and mind; receiving whatever sensations, thoughts, and feelings are present; acceptance.

Open 
Extension of mindfulness from internal to include the external; spaciousness; matures to include the relational moment; mutuality.

Attune to emergence 
Entering the relational moment without an agenda; awareness of the impermanence of thoughts and feelings; allowing experience to unfold; "don't know" mind. This guideline was originally termed "Trust emergence".

Listen deeply 
Listening mindfully, with an awareness that is relaxed and open; ripens into unhindered receptivity to the unfolding words, emotions, and presence of another.

Speak the truth 
Articulation of the truth of one's subjective experience with mindfulness; discernment of what to say amid the universe of possibilities; ripens into an acute sensitivity to the voice of the moment that "speaks through" the meditator.

See also 

 Appreciative inquiry
 Bohm Dialogue
 Community of inquiry
 Dialogue mapping
 Double-loop learning
 Focusing (psychotherapy)
 Four-sides model
 Improvisation
 Learning circle
 Nonviolent Communication
 T-groups
 Theory U

References

Sources

Further reading

External links 
 Gregory Kramer
 Metta Programs 
Towards a Mindful Cognitive Science: An Insight Dialogue Retreat, 2014
Insight Dialogue: The Power, Challenges and Joy of Meditating Together (Part 1) (audio, Dharmaseed.org) 
 Insight Dialogue: The Power, Challenges and Joy of Meditating Together (Part 2) (audio, Dharmaseed.org) 
Insight Dialogue: The Power, Challenges and Joy of Meditating Together (Part 3) (audio, Dharmaseed.org)

Buddhist meditation
Mindfulness movement